PICMG 1.1 is a PICMG specification that defines how PCI to PCI bridging is accomplished in PICMG 1.0 systems.

PICMG Status

Adopted : 5/25/1995

Current Revision : 1.1

References

Open standards
PICMG standards